Peter Hermann or Herrmann may refer to:

 Peter Hermann (actor) (born 1967), American actor
 Peter Hermann (cyclist) (born 1963), Liechtenstein track cyclist
 Peter Hermann (footballer) (born 1952), German football coach and former player
 Peter Herrmann, German composer
 Peter Herrmann (social philosopher), German philosopher
 Peter Herrmann (judoka) in 1966 European Judo Championships
 Peter Herrmann, voice actor in Happy Tree Friends

See also
 Hermann (name)
 Pete Herman (1896–1973), American boxer